Christophe Deneuville (born 26 May 1967) is a French swimmer. He competed in the men's 200 metre breaststroke at the 1984 Summer Olympics.

References

External links
 

1967 births
Living people
Olympic swimmers of France
Swimmers at the 1984 Summer Olympics
Place of birth missing (living people)
French male breaststroke swimmers